Bashkim Fino (12 October 1962 – 29 March 2021) was an Albanian socialist politician who served as the 29th Prime Minister of Albania from March to July 1997.

Biography
Fino studied economics in Tirana and the United States. After this, he worked as an economist in Gjirokastër, and in 1992 became its mayor. He was married and had two children.

On 11 March 1997, Democratic Party President Sali Berisha appointed Fino, a member of the opposition Socialist Party of Albania, Prime Minister in order to lead a government of national unity. This came after rebellion broke out over the collapse of several pyramid schemes leading to the government losing control of much of the country. Fino was Prime Minister through the 1997 elections where his Socialist Party won a large majority before he stepped down and was succeeded by his party leader Fatos Nano.

As of 2014, Fino was a Member of Parliament representing a constituency in the Korçë District. Fino was a lecturer at the Political Academy of the Socialist Party of Albania.

Fino was a devoted fan of Italian football team Inter Milan. In January 2018 he declared his intention to run for president of the Albanian Football Federation, challenging Armand Duka, the incumbent president of the last 16 years. The elections held on 7 February 2018, were lost by Fino, although he claimed that the voting process was irregular and that he would appeal to UEFA and FIFA.

Fino, who had Leukemia, died on 29 March 2021, after contracting COVID-19. He was 58.

See also
Political Academy of the Socialist Party of Albania

References

1962 births
2021 deaths
Government ministers of Albania
Prime Ministers of Albania
Deputy Prime Ministers of Albania
Public Works ministers of Albania
Tourism ministers of Albania
People from Gjirokastër
Socialist Party of Albania politicians
Albanian socialists
Mayors of Gjirokastër
Members of the Parliament of Albania
21st-century Albanian politicians
Deaths from the COVID-19 pandemic in Albania